Nawrahta Minye (also Anawrahta II of Sagaing) was king of Sagaing for seven months in 1349. He reversed his predecessor Kyaswa's policy of peace with Sagaing's cross-river rival Pinya although no war broke out. He was succeeded by his younger brother Tarabya II.

Brief
Minye was the third child of Queen Saw Hnaung and King Saw Yun of Sagaing. He was a grandson of kings Thihathu of Pinya and Kyawswa of Pagan. His father died about three months after his birth. Because the elder brother Kyaswa was not yet four, their half-uncle Tarabya I succeeded the throne, and raised Saw Hnaung as his chief queen. Minye grew up at the Sagaing Palace until he was about nine. In 1335/36, he and his three full siblings had to flee to Mindon, deep inside Pinya's territory after their half-cousin Shwetaungtet seized the throne. The siblings spent the next three years in exile with the help of their mother and her ally Chief Minister Nanda Pakyan until their cover was blown and brought back to Sagaing in 1339. But after a palace battle between loyalists of Shwetaungtet and Tarabya I killed both Shwetaungtet and Tarabya, Kyaswa was placed on the throne by Nanda Pakyan.

Kyaswa reigned for the next nine plus years. Minye likely played no more than a nominal role in his brother's administration since Nanda Pakyan actually ran the country. However, he was thrust into the center stage in 1349 when Kyaswa died without leaving a male heir. Minye became king with the reign name of Anawrahta. He apparently found a white elephant, considered a propitious symbol, during his reign, and proclaimed himself Hsinbyushin ("Lord of the White Elephant").

His reign lasted just over seven months. He may have reversed Kyaswa's policy of peace with Sagaing's cross-river rival Pinya. He gave sanctuary to Gov. Nawrahta of Pinle who was fleeing from his elder brother King Kyawswa I of Pinya. But no war broke out. Minye died shortly after 8 November 1349. He left no male heirs, and was succeeded by his younger brother Tarabya II.

Chronicle reporting differences
The royal chronicles do not agree on his birth, death and reign dates.

Ancestry

Notes

References

Bibliography
 
 
 
 
 

Myinsaing dynasty
Sagaing dynasty
1349 deaths
1326 births
14th-century Burmese monarchs